George Neilson Patterson (born 19 August 1920 in Falkirk, died at Auchlochan, Lesmahagow, 28 December 2012) also known as Khampa Gyau (bearded Khampa in Tibetan) and Patterson of Tibet, was a Scottish engineer and missionary who served as medical officer and diplomatic representative of the Tibetan resistance movement during the Annexation of Tibet by the People's Republic of China.

He was married to the surgeon Meg Patterson.

Letter of Remembrance
The International Campaign for Tibet awarded him their Light of Truth Award on 25 March 2011. In a letter presented with the award, a simple butter-lamp symbolizing the light the recipient has shed on the cause of Tibet, the Dalai Lama's Special Envoy Lodi Gyaltsen Gyari said: "It is my honour to convey to you in writing the decision of the Board of the International Campaign for Tibet to award you the Light of Truth, the highest recognition in the Tibet world of service to Tibet. The Board of Directors, chaired by Mr. Richard Gere, took the unanimous decision with great enthusiasm and, on their behalf, I offer you heartfelt congratulations. It gives my added pleasure as a Khampa to be the person to officially bring this news to you, Khampa Gyau ['bearded Khampa'], the name by which His Holiness the Dalai Lama fondly and humorously called you."

Publications

Joint publications

with Meg Patterson

Contributor

Documentaries

Advisor and scriptwriter
1964: Raid into Tibet with Adrian Cowell and Chris Menges
1970 Chasing the Dragon
1980 Synanon

See also
Geoffrey Bull

References

External links
 Article, including photograph of George Patterson on his Tibetan horse, at ExplorersWeb.com

1920 births
2012 deaths
People from Falkirk
20th-century Scottish medical doctors
Scottish Christian missionaries
Tibet freedom activists
Tibetan diplomats
Scottish journalists
Scottish explorers
Explorers of Tibet
Scottish travel writers
Scottish autobiographers
Christian medical missionaries
Scottish engineers
Scottish diplomats
Scottish Plymouth Brethren
BBC radio presenters
Scottish Liberal Party politicians
Scottish human rights activists
Scottish radio presenters
Scottish documentary filmmakers
Scottish editors
Scottish political writers
Christian writers
Tibet–United Kingdom relations
Protestant missionaries in Tibet